ICE L is a long-distance train which is being built by the Spanish company Talgo for the German train operator DB Fernverkehr and is scheduled to commence operation from 2024. The name of the train was changed in 2021 from its previous working title ECx, with the L standing for low-floor entry.
The manufacturer refers to the train units themselves as Talgo 230. They will replace old Intercity (IC) trains.

Order 

In November 2015, it was announced in a press release that Deutsche Bahn was planning to procure long-distance coaches in addition to the Intercity 2 double-decker trains. These were intended for use on international routes and for operation on non-electrified lines and to have a higher maximum speed than the 160 km/h of the Intercity 2 carriages. The related call for tenders for a framework contract was published on 2 March 2017.

In February 2019, Deutsche Bahn signed a framework agreement with Spanish manufacturer Patentes Talgo. Richard Lutz, chairman of Deutsche Bahn, announced that the best offer had been chosen, however Handelsblatt reported that Patentes Talgo was the only bidder. The framework contract includes the delivery of up to 100 trains and in the first call 23 trains were ordered for a total cost that should amount to around 550 million euros. At about 24 million euros, each train is thus much cheaper than an ICE.

The new rolling stock was presented to the public in mid-March 2019, under the working title ECx. Each train set will be 256 m long, and consist of 1 locomotive and 17 articulated cars. Each car is connected to the neighbouring car with a single-axle bogie, with double-axle bogies only at each end of the set. This gives each train 20 axles, in addition to those of the associated locomotive. Each unit will be delivered with a multi-system-electric Talgo Travca locomotive (19.5m, 4 axles, 72t). The single-axle carriage construction allows for a weight of 425 tonnes - which in turn makes it slightly lighter than a shorter seven-car ICE 4. Entry and floor heights are 76 cm throughout, allowing for step-free access from suitable platforms, and step-free passage throughout the train.

The Deutsche Bahn and the Federal Ministry of Transport and Digital Infrastructure have announced that all future tenders for long-distance passenger vehicles will have equivalent accessibility requirements (76 cm step-free entry and passage).

Train formation and equipment 

ICE L train sets will be certified for 230 km/h operation, and can be hauled either by the supplied Talgo Travca locomotive, or any other diesel or electric locomotive. Individual cars are shorter than typical railway carriages in order to avoid excessive axle load due to the single-axle design, as is typical for the Talgo design.

Each train set will have 477 second-class and 85 first-class seats, three wheelchair spaces, eight bicycle rides spaces, a separate toddler area and a family area with play area. Trains will be equipped with WLAN, onboard entertainment (ICE portal), numerous passenger information systems with real-time data and plenty of luggage space.
ICE L trains will all be equipped with a dining car of the usual DB standard.
Step free entry is possible at suitably constructed platforms thanks to a continuous 76 cm entry and floor height  - this matches one of the standard European platform heights. This helps ensure accessibility in Germany and the Netherlands.

Operation

Planned services 

DB Fernverkehr plans to use the new trains on the following routes:

Year-Round Services 
 Berlin–Amsterdam

Seasonal Services 
 Cologne–Oberstdorf (Winter)
 Berlin–Westerland (Sylt) (Summer)
 Cologne–Westerland (Sylt) (Summer)
 Karlsruhe–Westerland (Sylt) (Summer)

According to information from the Deutsche Bahn, the trains will gradually be put in service from the 2023/24 timetable change onwards and will first appear on the Berlin - Amsterdam route and then from the summer of 2024 onwards holiday services between Berlin, Cologne, Karlsruhe and Westerland. On the route from Berlin to Amsterdam, the journey time of the InterCity trains should be shortened by 30 minutes.

References 

Rolling stock of Germany
Passenger rail transport in Germany
Deutsche Bahn
Talgo